Magda Linette was the defending champion, but she chose to participate at the 2017 Mutua Madrid Open instead.

Beatriz Haddad Maia won the title, defeating Jil Teichmann in the final, 6–3, 6–3.

Seeds

Draw

Finals

Top half

Bottom half

References
Main Draw

Open de Cagnes-sur-Mer Alpes-Maritimes - Singles